Vacislav Neiman (born June 23, 1966) is a retired male boxer from Israel. He represented his native country at the 1996 Summer Olympics in Atlanta, Georgia, where he was stopped in the first round of the men's flyweight division (– 51 kg) by eventual silver medalist Bulat Jumadilov from Kazakhstan.

References
 sports-reference

1966 births
Living people
Flyweight boxers
Israeli Jews
Jewish boxers
Boxers at the 1996 Summer Olympics
Olympic boxers of Israel
Israeli male boxers